Elise Ransonnet-Villez or Elisa Nemes-Ransonnet (1843–1899) was an Austrian painter.

Ransonnet-Villez was born in Vienna and became a pupil of Franz von Lenbach and Heinrich von Angeli. She exhibited in Vienna and Munich. She became a baroness when she married the Hungarian count Nemes Nándorné. In 1879 she painted the portrait of Franz Liszt.
Ransonnet-Villez died in Brixen.

Gallery

References

External links

1843 births
1899 deaths
Artists from Vienna
19th-century Austrian painters
Austrian women painters
19th-century Austrian women artists